is a Prefectural Natural Park in Iwate Prefecture, Japan. Established in 1961, the park is wholly within the town of Nishiwaga. It encompasses the area around Lake Kinshu reservoir created by Yuda Dam and nearby hot spring resorts

See also
 National Parks of Japan

References

External links
  Map of Yuda Onsenkyō Prefectural Natural Park 

Parks and gardens in Iwate Prefecture
Protected areas established in 1961
1961 establishments in Japan
Nishiwaga, Iwate